The Albion-class landing platform dock is a class of amphibious warfare ship in service with the Royal Navy. Both ships were built by BAE Systems Marine at the former Vickers Shipbuilding and Engineering yard in Barrow-in-Furness. Albion was commissioned in 2003 and Bulwark in 2004. Each of the ships has a crew of 325 and can accommodate up to 405 troops. Thirty-one large trucks and thirty-six smaller vehicles and main battle tanks can be carried inside the vehicle deck. To disembark troops and vehicles, the vessels are equipped with eight landing craft.

Development
The value of the two s was highlighted during the Falklands War.  Not only did the ships transport troops and vehicles to the South Atlantic, the commanders of the landing operations at San Carlos were aboard , and once they arrived their flight decks were used to support airborne operations by helicopters and Sea Harrier jets.

As these ships were built in the 1960s, on 18 July 1996 the British Ministry of Defence awarded a £450 million contract for their replacements to Vickers Shipbuilding and Engineering Ltd (VSEL) in Barrow-in-Furness.

The ships' roles are "to act as the afloat command platform for the Royal Navy's Amphibious Task Force and Landing Force Commanders when embarked" and "to embark, transport, deploy and recover troops with their equipment and vehicles which form part of an amphibious assault force". They are larger and more capable than the Fearless class, and formed part of a modernization programme of the British amphibious fleet, which included the helicopter carrier  (until 2018), the s of the Royal Fleet Auxiliary and the s.

Extended readiness
To cut the running costs of the Royal Navy, the 2010 Strategic Defence and Security Review concluded that one of its two Albion-class LPDs should be placed into extended readiness, or uncrewed reserve, while the other is held at high readiness for operations. The vessels will alternate between extended readiness and high readiness throughout their service lives.

It was confirmed that Albion would be the first of the two vessels to be placed at extended readiness, for a cost of £2.5 million, as Bulwark had recently finished a major refit. Running costs while in extended readiness are estimated to be £300,000 per annum to keep the vessel available for reactivation at short notice. HMS Albion re-entered high readiness when HMS Bulwark was put into extended readiness. In 2014 Albion entered a regeneration refit and rejoined the active fleet in 2016. The running costs of one of the Albion-class vessels at high readiness ranged from £17.7 million to £38.6 million per annum from 2007 to 2011. As of late 2018 Albion was in active service while Bulwark was held at extended readiness.

Characteristics
The ships have a crew of 325 and can accommodate up to 405 troops, including their vehicles and combat supplies, in overload conditions. The GE Electric Propulsion System is powered by two Wärtsilä Vasa 16V 32E diesel generators generating at 6.6kV which drive two electric motors, two shafts, and a bow thruster as well as providing all the services power on the vessel. The first diesel electric propulsion system to be used in a Royal Navy surface ship was in the 1960s built Hecla-class ocean survey ships. This is the first in a major surface combatant vessel. It reduces the engine room crew by about 66 per cent compared with the preceding Fearless class of ships.

The aft flight deck has two landing spots for aircraft the size of a Chinook, although it has no hangar or aircraft storage facility. Below the flight deck are the dock and vehicle deck. The latter has the capacity to hold thirty-one large trucks and thirty-six smaller vehicles or six Challenger 2 tanks and thirty armoured personnel carriers. The dock can hold four Landing Craft Utility MK10, each large enough to carry vehicles up to main battle tank size, which are then launched by flooding of the dock area. Four smaller LCVP MK5 that can carry thirty-five men or two light trucks are carried on davits, two each side of the ship's superstructure. Each ship also carries a fifty-two ton tracked beach recovery vehicle for assisting with landing craft recovery, as well as two tractors: one that can lay a track-way across a landing beach, and the second fitted with an excavating bucket and forks.

Weapons and sensors
For defence against missile attack, the Albion-class LPDs were fitted with two 30 mm Goalkeeper CIWSs mounted fore and aft on the superstructure and two 20 mm cannon located on the forward superstructure. Defensive countermeasures include the Outfit DLJ decoys, eight Seagnat radar reflection / infra-red emitting decoy launchers and a BAE Systems DLH off-board decoy. In 2017, Albion had her Goalkeeper mounts removed and replaced by a pair of 20mm Phalanx mounts as part of her refit prior to returning to active service; Bulwark will have her Goalkeeper mounts removed upon her entry into Extended Readiness.

When commissioned, the ships were fitted with two Kelvin Hughes Type 1007/8 I-band radars, for navigation and aircraft control. For air and surface search, a Selex Sensors and Airborne Systems Radar Type 996 E/F band radar was fitted. From 2013 on, RT996 will be gradually replaced by the BAE Systems Maritime Services  Artisan 3D E/F-band (designated RT997).  was the first Royal Navy ship so fitted; RT997 will be fitted to Albion and Bulwark by 2015. There is also an ADAWS 2000 combat data system and a UAT/1-4 Electronic support measures (ESM) system.

Ships of the class

HMS Albion

HMS Albion was launched at Barrow-in-Furness on 9 March 2001. After completing sea trials, Albion was commissioned in June 2003 and became fully operational in April 2004. Her home port is HMNB Devonport on the south coast of England.

In December 2010, it was announced that Albion would be the next Royal Navy flagship after . She was deployed with the Response Force Task Group to the Gulf of Sidra off Libya to assist the ongoing NATO-led operation, and then moved into the Indian Ocean in June 2011 to assist with anti-piracy operations off the Horn of Africa. In 2011 she entered a state of "extended readiness". In July 2017, she re-entered active service after a long re-fit.

HMS Bulwark

HMS Bulwark, the second in the class, was launched at Barrow-in-Furness in November 2001, and was commissioned in December 2004.

One of Bulwarks first missions was Operation Highbrow in the Mediterranean in July 2006. Docking in Beirut, the ship evacuated around 1,300 United Kingdom nationals. In May 2010, she entered dry-dock at HMNB Devonport for a £30 million refit. In October 2011, Bulwark, having just completed an eight-month refit, became the flagship of the fleet. The refit improved her machinery and magazines, converted her to full night-vision tactical ability for landing craft and aircraft, and gave her the ability to operate two Chinook helicopters from the flight deck at the same time.

See also

 Amphibious warfare ship
 List of active Royal Marines military watercraft

References

Bibliography

External links

Active amphibious warfare vessels of the United Kingdom
 
Amphibious warfare vessel classes
Ship classes of the Royal Navy